Melvicalathis is a monotypic genus of brachiopods belonging to the family Chlidonophoridae. The only species is Melvicalathis macroctena.

The species is found in southern Pacific Ocean.

References

Terebratulida
Brachiopod genera
Monotypic brachiopod genera